John McCorkindale (1867–1953) was a Scottish footballer who played as a goalkeeper.

Career
McCorkindale played club football for Partick, Partick Thistle and Clyde, and made one appearance for Scotland in 1891, a 4–3 win over Wales. He was selected for the Glasgow FA's challenge matches which were common in the era, facing Edinburgh twice (both in 1890) and Sheffield in 1891.

He later became a referee.

References

Date of birth missing
1867 births
Date of death missing
1953 deaths
Scottish footballers
Scotland international footballers
Scottish Football League players
Partick Thistle F.C. players
Partick F.C. players
Clyde F.C. players
Association football goalkeepers
Scottish football referees
Scottish Football League referees